Dzintars Lācis (18 May 1940 – 17 November 1992) was a Latvian cyclist. He had competed at the 1964 and 1968 Summer Olympics in the 4 km team pursuit and finished in fifth and fourth place, respectively. He had been part of the Soviet team that won the team pursuit at the 1967 UCI Track Cycling World Championships. Between 1961 and 1969 he won seven Soviet titles in various track (mostly pursuit) events.

References

1940 births
1992 deaths
Latvian male cyclists
Olympic cyclists of the Soviet Union
Cyclists at the 1964 Summer Olympics
Cyclists at the 1968 Summer Olympics
Soviet male cyclists
Sportspeople from Jelgava
Honoured Masters of Sport of the USSR